Volkmer is a German surname. Notable people with the surname include:

 Dominic Volkmer (born 1996), German footballer
 Harold Volkmer (1931–2011), American politician
 Heinz Volkmer, Austrian bobsledder

See also
 Volkmar
 Vollmer

German-language surnames